Donald Dexter Van Slyke (March 29, 1883 – May 4, 1971) was a Dutch American biochemist. His achievements included the publication of 317 journal articles and 5 books, as well as numerous awards, among them the National Medal of Science and the first AMA Scientific Achievement Award.  The Van Slyke determination, a test of amino acids, is named after him.

Early days and education
Van Slyke was born in Pike, New York on March 29, 1883. He completed his BA in 1905 and PhD in 1907 both at the University of Michigan, his father's alma mater. His PhD studies were performed under Moses Gomberg.

Post-doctoral study
Van Slyke took up a post-doctoral position at the Rockefeller Institute in 1907, under Phoebus Levene. Levene also arranged for him to spend one year in Berlin under Hermann Emil Fischer in 1911. His early work focused on determining the amino acid composition of proteins. A major achievement during this time was the discovery of the amino acid hydroxylysine.

Urease 
Work with G. E. Cullen on urease led to a mechanism that yields a kinetic equation observationally indistinguishable from the Henri–Michaelis–Menten equation, but based on different assumptions. Whereas Henri, and later Michaelis and Menten, treated the binding of substrate to free enzyme to produce an enzyme–substrate complex as an equilibrium, Van Slyke and Cullen treated it as an irreversible reaction:

Enzyme  + substrate  → enzyme–substrate complex  → enzyme  + product

Effectively, therefore, they assumed a steady-state process. Their equation for the rate  at substrate concentration ,

resembles the Henri–Michaelis–Menten equation but the constant  in the denominator is interpreted differently.

Clinical chemistry
In 1914, Van Slyke was appointed chief chemist of the newly founded Rockefeller Institute Hospital, where he played a key part in developing the field of clinical chemistry. His work focused especially on the measurement of gas and electrolyte levels in tissues, for which he is considered to be one of the founders of modern quantitative blood chemistry. He is also considered by many to have first popularised the term "clinical chemistry" in his two-volume work Quantitative Clinical Chemistry, co-published with John P. Peters. The two-volume work was widely accepted in the medical world as the "Bible" of quantitative clinical chemistry. During this period, he also served as managing editor of the Journal of Biological Chemistry from 1914 to 1925.

Brookhaven
In 1948, approaching retirement age, Van Slyke took up a position as Deputy Director of Biology and Medicine of the newly formed Brookhaven National Laboratory. He held this position briefly before moving back into research at Brookhaven, which he continued until his death in 1971.

Awards and honors

Honorary doctor of science degrees
 Yale University, 1925
 University of Michigan, 1935
Northwestern University, 1940
University of Chicago, 1941
University of London, 1951
Rockefeller University, 1966

Honorary doctor of medicine degrees

University of Oslo, 1938
University of Amsterdam, 1962
University of Ulm, 1970

Medals and awards 
Charles Mickle Fellowship, University of Toronto, 1936
Phillip A. Conne Medal, Chemists' Club of New York, 1936
 Willard Gibbs Award, Chicago Section of the American Chemical Society, 1939
 Order of Brilliant Jade, Republic of China, 1939
 Kober Medal, Association of American Physicians, 1942
 Order of Brilliant Star, Republic of China, 1947
 Fisher Award in Analytical Chemistry, American Chemical Society, 1953
 John Phillips Memorial Award, American College of Physicians, 1954
 First Van Slyke Award in Clinical Chemistry, American Association of Clinical Chemists, 1957
 First Scientific Achievement Award, American Medical Association, 1962
 Ames Award, American Association of Clinical Chemistry, 1964
 National Medal of Science, USA, 1965
 Elliott Cresson Medal, Franklin Institute of Philadelphia, 1965
 Academy Medal for Distinguished Contributions in Biomedical Science, New York Academy of Medicine, 1967

References

People from Pike, New York
University of Michigan alumni
American biochemists
American people of Dutch descent
National Medal of Science laureates
1883 births
1971 deaths
Scientists from New York (state)
Clinical chemists
Journal of Biological Chemistry editors